The Lord's Garden is a band formed by Peter Hemsley from Sydney and Craig Sunderland in England Both were members of Solstice. Their double album Journeys was nominated for the 1997 ARIA Award for Best Dance Release.

Band members
Peter Hemsley
Craig Sunderland

Discography

Studio albums

Awards

ARIA Music Awards
The ARIA Music Awards is an annual awards ceremony that recognises excellence, innovation, and achievement across all genres of Australian music. They commenced in 1987. The Lord's Garden were nominated for one award.

|-
| 1997
| Journey
| ARIA Award for Best Dance Release
| 
|-

References

Australian dance music groups